Sierra Leone is divided into four provinces (until 2017, three) and one Western Area; these are further divided into 16 districts (previously 14), and the districts are further divided into 190 (previously 149) chiefdoms.

Provinces
Eastern Province
Northern Province
Southern Province
North West Province

Areas
Western Area

See also
ISO 3166-2:SL
Administrative divisions of Sierra Leone

References

External links

 
Subdivisions of Sierra Leone
Sierra Leone, Provinces
Sierra Leone 1
Provinces, Sierra Leone
Sierra Leone geography-related lists